Pristimantis citriogaster, also known as the throated robber frog, is a species of frog in the family Strabomantidae. It is known from northern Peru near Tarapoto (the type locality) and south-eastern Ecuador. Its natural habitats are premontane rainforest and cloud forest. Adults are nocturnal and typically occur on rocks in and along cascading streams. Its altitudinal range is  asl.

Pristimantis citriogaster is threatened by habitat loss.

Description
Pristimantis citriogaster has a characteristic bright yellow belly (as alluded to in its name). Skin on dorsum is shagreen without tubercles. Tympanum is distinct.

References

citriogaster
Amphibians of Ecuador
Amphibians of Peru
Amphibians described in 1992
Taxonomy articles created by Polbot